Solidago nitida is a North American plant species in the family Asteraceae, common name shiny goldenrod. The species is native to the south-central United States, in the southern Great Plains and Lower Mississippi Valley. It is found in the states of Oklahoma, Texas, Louisiana, Arkansas, and Mississippi.

Solidago nitida  is a perennial herb up to 100 cm (40 inches) tall. Leaves are hairless and shiny, found both at the base of the plant and higher up on the stem. One plant can produce as many as 100 small yellow flower heads in a compact, flat-topped array.

References

External links
Samuel Roberts Noble Foundation, Plant Image Gallery: Solidago nitida photos

nitida
Plants described in 1842
Flora of the Southern United States